East Malvern railway station is a commuter railway station in Malvern East, a suburb of Melbourne, Victoria, Australia. The station opened on 3 February 1929 as Eastmalvern as part of the one stop extension of the Burnley line. It was renamed East Malvern on 29 February 1972. The station consists of two side platforms accessed by a pedestrian bridge. There are two principal station buildings with one located on each platform. These buildings are both single story and act as customer service, staff, and waiting room facilities. These buildings were provided in 1975 as part of the station rebuild. The station is not fully accessible as there are steep access ramps.

East Malvern railway station is served by the Glen Waverley line, part of the Melbourne railway network. The station also connects to the route 612 bus service. The journey to Southern Cross railway station is approximately 13.75 kilometres (8.54 mi) and takes 30 minutes.

Description 
East Malvern railway station is located in the suburb of Malvern East, a suburb of Melbourne, Victoria. The station is located nearby to the Waverley Road shopping precinct and Waverley Park. The station is owned by VicTrack, a state government agency, and the station is operated by Metro Trains. The station is approximately 13.75 kilometres (8.54 mi), or a 30-minute train journey, from Southern Cross station. The adjacent stations are Darling station up towards Melbourne, and Holmesglen station down towards Glen Waverley.

The station consists of two side platforms with a total of two platform edges. Standard in Melbourne, the platform has an asphalt surface with concrete on the edges. The platforms are approximately 160 metres (524.93 Ft) long, enough for a Metro Trains 7 car HCMT. The station features a pedestrian bridge, accessed from the centre of the platforms by a ramp built in 1987. The station features two principal station buildings, one of each side of the platforms built in 1975. These buildings act as staff facilities and passenger waiting rooms, and are constructed with cream bricks, wood, and ribbed roofing panels.

The station building, platform, and overpass are largely the same as when it was rebuilt in 1975, with the main change being updated signage, technology, and more car parking. The station features 675 carparks on the south side of the station. The station is listed as an "assisted access" station on the Metro Trains website, as the access ramp is too steep and would require assistance for wheelchair customers to traverse.

History
The first section of what later became the Glen Waverley line opened on 3 March 1890. It was part of the Outer Circle line, and connected Burnley and Oakleigh stations. After the section of the Outer Circle line to from Oakleigh to Camberwell was closed on 9 December 1895, trains from Burnley terminated at Darling. East Malvern railway station opened on 3 February 1929 as a one-stop extension of the Darling line. The line was extended again the following year, with the addition of 5 new stations, now terminating at Glen Waverley. The station is named after Malvern East, the suburb that the station is located in. Previously, the station was named Eastmalvern upon opening, with the station being renamed East Malvern on 29 February 1972. 
During part of the 1950s and 1960s, there was an additional dock platform at the down end of Platform 1, making it half resemble an island platform. Trains up to three cars long could fit in the dock platform, however it typically accommodated a single swing-door "dogbox" car. This train ran a shuttle service between East Malvern and Glen Waverley, with most trains at night, on weekends, and public holidays terminating at East Malvern. Every second or third train connected with the Glen Waverley shuttle. The dock platform was abolished in 1954 after a restructuring of services. Two years later in 1956, the line between East Malvern and Darling was duplicated, with the duplication to Mount Waverley occurring in 1964.

The station was rebuilt in 1975 to coincide with the construction of the South Eastern Arterial link. This was the final station rebuild with the station buildings remaining almost the same into the 21st century. Around this time, parcel facilities were abolished at the station inpart to a reduction in usage. A pedestrian overpass crossing the Monash Freeway was located adjacent to the station in the down direction. The structure opened in 1988. While the freeway was under construction, the line was rerouted through an artificial tunnel, with a timber trestle bridge crossing a local creek being replaced as part of the works. East Malvern was upgraded to a Premium Station on 21 August 1995.

The station has had little changes in the 21st century, with the replacement of the footbridge occurring in 2009 to accommodate the widening of the Monash Freeway, and the introduction of a Parkiteer secure bike cage next to the station entrance on Platform 1 in the 2010s.

Platforms and services
East Malvern has two side platforms with two faces. The station is currently served by the Glen Waverley line—a service on the metropolitan rail network. The Glen Waverley line runs from Glen Waverley station south east of Melbourne, joining the Belgrave, Lilydale, and Alamein lines at Burnley station before travelling through the city loop.

Platform 1:
 stopping all stations and limited express services to Flinders Street.

Platform 2:
 stopping all stations to Glen Waverley.

Transport links
East Malvern station has one bus connection. The station connects to the route 612 bus service from Box Hill station to Chadstone Shopping Centre. The station does not have a bus interchange due to the limited number of transport links stopping at the station, and instead is operated through on-street bus stops. East Malvern station also has train replacement bus stops located adjacent to the station.

Bus connections:
: Box Hill station – Chadstone Shopping Centre

References

External links
 Public Transport Victoria
 

Premium Melbourne railway stations
Railway stations in Melbourne
Railway stations in Australia opened in 1929
Railway stations in the City of Stonnington